John Ramsden may refer to:
 John Ramsden (died 1646) (1594–1646), English politician
 John Ramsden (died 1665), English politician 
 John Ramsden (died 1718), MP for Hull 1685–1695
 Sir John Ramsden, 1st Baronet (1648–1690), first of the Ramsden baronets
 Sir John Ramsden, 3rd Baronet (1699–1769), MP for Appleby
 Sir John Ramsden, 4th Baronet (1755–1839), MP for Grampound
 John Charles Ramsden (1788–1836), son of the 4th Baronet, Whig politician in Yorkshire, MP between 1812 and 1836
 John William Ramsden (1831–1914), MP for Taunton, Hythe, West Riding of Yorkshire, and Monmouth; Under-Secretary of State for War
 Sir John Frecheville Ramsden, 6th Baronet (1877–1958) of the Ramsden baronets
 Sir John Ramsden, 9th Baronet (born 1950), on List of ambassadors of the United Kingdom to Croatia
 John Ramsden (cricketer) (1878–1973), New Zealand cricketer
 John Ramsden (historian) (1947–2009), professor of history at Queen Mary, University of London